Australian Christian College – Singleton is an independent non-denominational Christian co-educational early learning, primary and secondary day school, located in Singleton in the Upper Hunter Valley region of New South Wales, Australia. The school caters for children ranging from early learning to Year 10.

Australian Christian College – Singleton is one of nine Australian Christian Colleges located in Australia.

Overview
The school's vision is to develop students who are equipped spiritually, academically, socially and physically to be a positive influence on the world.

The school is owned and operated by Christian Education Ministries Ltd and is a member of Christian Schools Australia and the Association of Independent Schools of New South Wales.

In 2013, the school transitioned from Singleton Christian College to Australian Christian College – Singleton. It has approximately 110 students. Most students who attend the school reside in Singleton and a smaller number travel from nearby towns such as Branxton, Greta, Muswellbrook and Denman. Enrolment is open to Christian students of all denominations as well as non-Christian students.

In 2010, the Singleton Trade Training Centre was built on the school campus. This initiative is a partnership between Singleton High School (which offers Construction and Hospitality), St Catherine's Catholic College (which offers Primary Industries), Singleton TAFE (which offers Automotive), and Australian Christian College – Singleton (which offers Electrotechnology).

See also

List of non-government schools in New South Wales

References

External links
Official school website
Christian Education Ministries Ltd
Christian Schools Australia
Association of Independent Schools of NSW
Trade Training Centre, Singleton

Singleton
Private primary schools in New South Wales
Educational institutions established in 1988
Singleton, New South Wales
Private secondary schools in New South Wales
1988 establishments in Australia
Nondenominational Christian schools in New South Wales